Housing in the United States includes both detached homes and apartment buildings. Housing is a vital economic sector, contributing to 15% of the GDP.  Owner-occupancy is commonplace; the majority own their home. For regional details, see also housing in the United States by state.

Overview 

Housing as shelter is one of the "basic needs" of humans, offering protection against the elements. It also provides a place of privacy away from the public eye where daily activities can take place. Residents often have personal attachment to a house, making it a home. A home's location, style and access to schools, parks, and other amenities can align a household to a greater community to reinforce cultural or religious bonds. These characteristics can also reinforce residential segregation and unequal access to amenities.

Housing is also important to developers, builders, lenders, realtors, investors, architects, and other specialized professions and trades. These groups view housing as a commodity for financial gain.

As the United States industrialized in the 20th century, demand for housing fueled job growth and consumer products to create economic growth. By the 1970s, manufacturing began to  decline and the knowledge economy began to emerge. As a result, regional economies began to diverge and housing costs rose drastically in economic centers such as New York, San Francisco and Boston.  In 2016, housing costs in two thirds of the United States exceeded wage growth.

For households earning 30% of the county's median income, most counties in the United States do not have rental housing considered affordable to at least half that income segment (one-third of 30% of median).

Construction 

Wood framing is widely used in home construction in the United States, accounting for 90% of new houses in 2019. Concrete is used to build a foundation, usually with either a crawl space, or basement included. Interiors usually have drywall. Roofing often consists of asphalt shingles, although steel, and tile materials are also used.

Wood-frame construction in the United States is more cost effective than masonry, in part because bricks typically must be shipped farther and labor costs are higher; however, it is perceived to be flimsy in comparison to typical European construction. The federal government and insurance agencies have tried to promote concrete-frame construction and other basic techniques for resisting extreme weather events, but with little success: a 2017 report by McKinsey concluded that "the productivity of construction remains stuck at the same level as 80 years ago".

Supply 

There are about 135 million homes in the United States as of 2016. Housing researchers generally conclude that the supply of housing in the United States is too low to meet demand, resulting in high prices that some have described as an affordability crisis. Among the renting population, nearly half pay more than 30% of their income toward rent.

Although a nationwide problem, the undersupply of housing is caused in large part by local community actions that discourage new development. These include the imposition of regulations such as single-family zoning, minimum parking requirements, and height restriction laws that limit the density of new residences within a municipality or increase the expense and difficulty of construction. These tactics are related to the social phenomenon of nimbyism, in which existing residents, especially those who own property, work to stymie new construction.
In particular, the suppression of moderate-density housing such as duplexes and townhouses has resulted in a so-called missing middle problem that drives up housing scarcity and inhibits the development of walkable neighborhoods. 

The typical age of a home varies by state, with a national median of 39 years. A 2016 report by the Center for American Progress found that 30 million homes have health or safety hazards, such as problems with plumbing, natural gas, or heating; 6 million of these homes have structural problems. Structural failures in condominium or apartment buildings have resulted in catastrophic loss of life, as in the 2021 Surfside condominium collapse. Many of the 160,000 condominium buildings in the United States do not have sufficient funds to carry out major repairs.

Poor-quality housing in the United States is associated with increases in chronic illnesses such as asthma and eczema, as well as the negative effects from the persistence of environmental lead (e.g., from lead paint that has not been removed). These effects are particularly acute in the dilapidated housing characteristic of dense urban environments.

Investment property 

Economists have noted increasing ownership of housing units by investors keeping the units vacant or renting them to the exclusion of traditional homebuyers. Investors bought about one of every seven U.S. homes in the first quarter of 2021, up from the prior three quarters, in which they bought closer to 1 in 10 homes. Senator Jeff Merkley has introduced legislation to curb residential real estate ownership by hedge funds.

Homelessness 

In 2014, approximately 1.5 million homeless people resided in shelters. , the Department of Housing and Urban Development reported there were roughly 553,000 homeless people in the United States on a given night, or 0.17% of the population. Recent spikes in the homeless population include a 44% increase in Seattle in 2017 and 16% in the city of Los Angeles in 2019. In January 2018 the federal government statistics gave comprehensive encompassing nationwide statistics, with a total number of 552,830 individuals, of which 358,363 (65%) were sheltered in provided housing, while some 194,467 (35%) were unsheltered.

See also 
 Cost of rent by state and county in the United States
 California housing shortage
 New York City housing shortage
 San Francisco housing shortage

References

Further reading

External links